Sir Ambrose Jermyn (1511 – 5 April 1577) of Rushbrooke, Suffolk, was an English courtier, magistrate and landowner.

Origins
He was the son of Sir Thomas Jermyn (died 1552) of Rushbrooke by his wife Anne Spring, the eldest daughter of Thomas Spring of Lavenham, Suffolk.

Career
He inherited his father's Rushbrooke Hall estate following his death in 1552. A fervent Roman Catholic, he was knighted by Queen Mary I and served as a Justice of the Peace in Suffolk. In this role he was a notable prosecutor and persecutor of Protestants across East Anglia until the accession of Queen Elizabeth I. He served as Sheriff of Norfolk and Suffolk in 1558 and 1572.

Marriage and children
In 1538 he married Anne Heveningham, daughter of George Heveningham of Rushbrooke, and his wife Margaret, daughter of John Burgoyne, by whom he had thirteen children, including:
Sir Robert Jermyn, eldest surviving son and heir, a Protestant magistrate. His will was proved in May 1577.
Susan Jermyn, wife of Lyonell Tollemache of Helmingham Hall in Suffolk, and mother of Sir Lionel Tollemache, 1st Baronet (1562–).

References

1511 births
1577 deaths
English justices of the peace
English Roman Catholics
High Sheriffs of Norfolk
High Sheriffs of Suffolk
Ambrose
Knights Bachelor
People from Rushbrooke with Rougham
16th-century English people
People from the Borough of St Edmundsbury